Alfred Percival Bullen (February 8, 1896 in Kiama, New South Wales – August 11, 1974 in Penrith, New South Wales) was, along with his brothers, the circus founder of Bullen's Circus.

Alfred, also known as Perce was the son of Alfred Weston Bullen and his wife Alice, originally from New Zealand.

Alfred married his wife Lilian in 1917. Beginning with a merry-go-round Alfred and his brothers started a travelling circus carnival. By 1922 they had enough money to create Bullen's Circus. Bullen's Circus travelled Australia and provided the learning step for Alfred's sons to establish Australia's renowned African Lion Safari.

They had three sons, Stafford Bullen, Kenneth Bullen and Gregory Bullen and adopted daughter and son Mavis and Jules.

His wife Lilian died of cancer on 4 January 1965. Alfred remarried widow Daisy Ruth Wood 3 January 1969.

After the popularity of television Bullen gave a final performance on 25 May 1969 and happily retired to the family estate at Wallacia, New South Wales, Australia.

Bullen is buried at Eastern Creek Cemetery, Eastern Creek, New South Wales, Australia.

References 

1896 births
1974 deaths
Circus owners
20th-century Australian businesspeople